Alvira Khan Agnihotri (born 13 December 1969) is an Indian film producer and fashion designer. In 2016, she received a Stardust Award for Best Costume Design for her work on Sultan. She is the daughter of major dialogue writer and producer Salim Khan and sister of actors Salman Khan, Arbaaz Khan and Sohail Khan.

Career and collaborations
Agnihotri co-produced the 2011 Hindi film Bodyguard.

Her father, Salim Khan, is a Hindi film screenplay writer. Her elder brother is actor Salman Khan and she has designed outfits for him for his movie appearances.

Following their successful collaboration on Bodyguard, Agnihotri made plans with her brother and husband for a film called Sultan. She shared a Stardust Award in 2016 for Best Costume Design with Ashley Rebello for their work on Sultan.

Personal life
Agnihotri is married to actor-producer Atul Agnihotri. They have two children, daughter Alizeh and son Ayaan.

Filmography

Awards 

Stardust Award in 2016 for Best Costume Design. Shared with Ashley Rebello for the film Sultan

References

External links 

 
 Alvira Khan Agnihotri on Twitter
 Alvira Khan Agnihotri at Bollywood Hungama
 Alvira Khan Agnihotri at Rotten Tomatoes

Indian women film producers
Indian women fashion designers
Film producers from Mumbai
People from Bandra
Indian costume designers
Living people
Hindi film producers
Women artists from Maharashtra
1969 births
Businesswomen from Maharashtra
Salim Khan family